Harbison House may refer to:

Harbison House (Vacaville, California), located on the site of the Nut Tree
Harbison House (Scotts Station, Kentucky), listed  on the National Register of Historic Places
Harbison House (Shelbyville, Kentucky), listed on the National Register of Historic Places
Harbison College President's Home, Abbeville, South Carolina, listed on the National Register of Historic Places
Thomas Grant Harbison House, Highlands, North Carolina, listed on the NRHP in Macon County
Culbertson–Harbison Farm, Nyesville, Pennsylvania, listed on the NRHP in Franklin County